Rajepur is a town in Ambedkar Nagar district in the Indian state of Uttar Pradesh and is Subpost Office of Rajesultanpur.

Demographics
 India census, Rajepur had a population of 15632. Males constitute 51% of the population and females 49%. Rajepur has an average literacy rate of 62%, higher than the national average of 59.5%: male literacy is 71%, and female literacy is 52%. In Rajepur, 17% of the population is under 6 years of age.

Nearby settlements 
 Rajesultanpur 0.3 km
 Tanda 53 km
 Azamgarh 28 km
 Gorakhpur 62 km
 Faizabad 124 km

References

Villages in Ambedkar Nagar district